The Type 054 (NATO Codename Jiangkai I) is a class of Chinese multi-role frigates that were commissioned in the People's Liberation Army Navy Surface Force in 2005. They superseded the Type 053H3 frigates. Only two ships, Ma'anshan (525), and Wenzhou (526), were completed before production switched to the VLS equipped improved Type 054A frigate.

Design
The Type 054 has a stealthy hull design with sloped surfaces, radar absorbent materials, and a reduced superstructure clutter.

The main anti-ship armament were YJ-83 sea-skimming anti-ship cruise missiles in two four-cell launchers. It retained the HQ-7 SAM, an improved version of the French Crotale, from the preceding Type 053H3; the HQ-7 had a ready-to-fire 8-cell launcher, with 16 stored in the automatic reloader. Short range defence was improved with four AK-630 CIWS turrets. A 100 mm main gun, also based on a French design, was mounted.

Both ships were powered by four CODAD Type 16 PA6 STC marine diesel engines designed by SEMT Pielstick, each generating 6,330 hp. Licenses for the engines were sold to China in April 2002, where they were built by the Shaanxi Diesel Engine Factory. Other reports claimed each ship was powered by two (or four) Type 16 PA STC and two MTU 20V 956TB92 diesels.

Comparison with La Fayette class
The Type 054 resembled the French s in shape and displacement. In addition, the Chinese used French, or French-derived, electronics and weapons. The French exported these systems to China in the 1980s, and later granted production licences. These systems were similar to those used on the La Fayettes in the 1980s.

The succeeding Type 054A frigates incorporated a larger proportion of more-advanced indigenous systems.

Operations
Ma'anshan and Wenzhou deployed from Zhoushan on 21 February 2011 to undertake an anti-piracy patrol off Somalia. They were the eighth such Chinese patrol and, following Wenzhou's pennant number, gained the semi-compatible Task Force designation 'Task Force 526'. Commodore Han Xiaohu commanded the flotilla from Wenzhou. En route the flotilla made a stop at Karachi, before setting sail again on 13 March 2011. The ships were joined by replenishment ship Qiandaohu (886), which was already deployed with the preceding flotilla.

Ships of class

See also
 List of naval ship classes in service

References

External links 
 Chinese Defense Today page
 Chinese Navy